Nathaniel Beverley Tucker (September 6, 1784 – August 26, 1851) was an American author, judge, legal scholar, and political essayist.

Life and politics
Tucker was generally known by his middle name. He was born into a socially elite and politically influential Virginia family: his father was the noted legal scholar St. George Tucker, and his half-brother was the John Randolph of Roanoke.  Tucker's older brother Henry St. George Tucker, Sr., too, went on to have an eminent career as a law professor and Congressman in antebellum Virginia. His nephew Nathaniel Beverley Tucker, a U.S. diplomat and later secret agent for the Confederacy, was named after him. His daughter Cynthia became a notable preservationist in Virginia.

He graduated from the College of William & Mary in 1801, studied law, and practised in Virginia. After moving with his family to the Missouri territory in 1816, Tucker served as a circuit court judge from 1817 until 1832.  He returned to Virginia in 1833 and served as a Professor of Law at William and Mary, his alma mater (Class of 1802), from 1834 to his death in 1851.

Tucker opposed the nullification movement in South Carolina, but maintained that individual states had the right to secede from the Union. From the 1830s onward he was a Fire-Eater and a leading academic spokesman for states' rights and Southern unity. He wrote frequently for the Southern Literary Messenger and other periodicals, and carried on an extensive correspondence with influential Southern political leaders, including President John Tyler, Secretary of State Abel P. Upshur, and South Carolina Governor James Henry Hammond.

Tucker was a Freemason. He was one of the Organizers of the Grand Lodge of Missouri and served as its second Grand Master from 1821-1824.

He died in Winchester, Virginia, at the age of 66 years.

Fiction
Tucker is probably best remembered for his 1836 novel The Partisan Leader. Set in the United States of 1849, the story depicts a war between secessionist guerrillas in Virginia and a despotic federal government led by President-turned-dictator Martin Van Buren.  In Tucker's future, the slaveholding states south of Virginia have already seceded, driven out of the Union by Van Buren's centralizing government and exploitative tariff policy.  While the Old Dominion itself remains under federal control, the plot of The Partisan Leader concerns the efforts of patriotic Virginian irregulars to defeat government forces and join the independent Southern Confederacy.

At the onset of the American Civil War in 1861, the novel was regarded by many in the North and South as a prophetic vision of the collapse of the Union.  It was republished that year in New York with the subtitle "A Key to the Disunion Conspiracy", and next year in Richmond with the subtitle "A Novel, and an Apocalypse of the Origin and Struggles of the Southern Confederacy".

Tucker wrote two other novels. George Balcombe, also published in 1836, was called "the best American novel" by Edgar Allan Poe. Gertrude was serialized 1844–1845 in the Southern Literary Messenger.

Works
Besides the works already mentioned, he wrote:
Discourse on the Importance of the Study of Political Science as a Branch of Academic Education in the United States (Richmond, 1840)
Discourse on the Dangers that threaten the Free Institutions of the United States (1841)
Lectures intended to Prepare the Student for the Study of the Constitution of the United States (Philadelphia, 1845)
Principles of Pleading (Boston, 1846).

He left an unfinished life of his half-brother, John Randolph of Roanoke. He wrote a great number of political and miscellaneous essays, and was a large contributor to The Southern Literary Messenger of Richmond, Virginia, and to the Southern Quarterly Review. He also maintained an extensive correspondence with scholars and politicians.

Bibliography
Robert J. Brugger, Beverley Tucker: Heart over Head in the Old South (Baltimore: Johns Hopkins University Press, 1977).
Beverley D. Tucker, Nathaniel Beverley Tucker: Prophet of the Confederacy, 1784-1851 (Tokyo: Nan'undo, 1979).
Drew Gilpin Faust, A Sacred Circle: The Dilemma of the Intellectual in the Old South, 1840-1860 (Philadelphia: University of Pennsylvania Press, 1977).
"Recent Deaths"; New York Daily Times; September 18, 1851; page 2. (Accessed from The New York Times (1851–2003), ProQuest Historical Newspapers, September 19, 2006).

Notes

References

External links
 Documenting the American South - The full text of The Partisan Leader
  Internet Archive - The full text of George Balcombe  
 Colonial Williamsburg - The Life and Literature of Nathaniel Beverley Tucker
  (12 as "Tucker, Beverley, 1784-1851", and probably some others)
 

1784 births
1851 deaths
Nathaniel Beverley Tucker
American people of English descent
People from Winchester, Virginia
College of William & Mary faculty
College of William & Mary alumni
American essayists
American jurists
Novelists from Virginia
Writers of American Southern literature
American male essayists
19th-century essayists
19th-century male writers
American male novelists
19th-century American novelists
American proslavery activists
Origins of the American Civil War
American Fire-Eaters